Paraprobatius bucki is a species of beetle in the family Cerambycidae, the only species in the genus Paraprobatius.

References

Acanthocinini